You Only Live Once is a 2017 Argentine-Spanish action comedy satire film directed by Federico Cueva and starring Juan Pedro Lanzani, Gérard Depardieu,  Santiago Segura and Hugo Silva.

Plot 
Leonardo Andrade (Juan Pedro Lanzani) is the wrong man in the wrong place at the wrong time. After taping a murder and keeping the evidence he runs away to stay alive and, in order to survive, he has to cover up himself. Under a new identity he will become an orthodox Hasidic Jew. A french ruthless killer, Duges (Gérard Depardieu) and his associates Tobías López (Santiago Segura) and Harken (Hugo Silva) will hunt Leo. Their nonstop chase has only one exhilarating speed. Time is running out and his enemies are getting closer. Now Leo a ragtag bunch of misfits will face the biggest challenge of their lives.

Cast 
 Juan Pedro Lanzani as Leonardo Andrade
 Santiago Segura as Tobías López
 Carlos Areces as Sergio González Peña
 Gérard Depardieu as Duges
 Hugo Silva as Harken
 María Eugenia Suárez as Flavia
 Pablo Rago as Agustín
 Darío Lopilato as Yosi
 Pablo Cedrón as Olivera
 Luis Brandoni as Mendi
 Alejandro Fiore as Seagal
 Arancha Martí as Sara Kreiner
 Adryano Matianellu as Juan
 Walter Donado as Arzola
 Naim Sibara as Van Damme
 Pepe Monje as Fireman
 Iván Steinhardt as Policeman

Production 
The original script was written by Sergio Esquenazi under the name Kosher Bullets. The idea for the script comes from his experiences at a Chabad House in Westwood, Los Angeles. Some of the characters like Rabbi Mendi were based on real Chabad people. Sergio is a big fan of the rock group Kiss, and he wrote the main character (Lanzani) as a staunch fanatic of the band. The script is actually an adaptation of Kosher Bullets, which was an action comedy and was adapted to a satire by Nicolás Allegro, Mili Roque Pitt and Axel kuschevatzky. I Was Made For Lovin' You, iconic Kiss song, is the music for the official trailer.

References

External links 

2017 films
Spanish action comedy films
2010s Spanish-language films
Spanish satirical films
Argentine action comedy films
Argentine satirical films
2017 action comedy films
2010s satirical films
2010s chase films
2017 comedy films
2010s Argentine films